November 2017

References

 11
November 2017 events in the United States